Canyon Partners is an employee-owned hedge fund founded by Joshua S. Friedman and Mitchell R. Julis in 1990 located in Los Angeles, California.

Canyon Partners is a multi-strategy hedge fund and invests across asset classes ranging from bank debt, high yield and distressed securities, securitized assets, direct investments, convertible arbitrage, risk arbitrage, equities, and special situation securities. It has offices across the world in cities including Dallas, Hong Kong, London, Los Angeles, New York, Seoul, Shanghai, and Tokyo.

As of January 2015, assets were approximately $23 billion. In 2011 Hedge Fund Journal's 50 Largest US Hedge Fund Managers, Canyon Capital Advisors ranked 20. In 2015, Institutional Investor/Alpha magazine gave Canyon an A grade and the 10th position in the ranking among hedge funds worldwide.

References

External links 
 Official website

Financial services companies established in 1990
Hedge fund firms in California